Mar Mitenge ( Bear The Death) is a 1988 Hindi-language action film, produced by Pradeep Sharma under the TUTU Films banner and directed by Kawal Sharma. It stars Jeetendra, Mithun Chakraborty, Madhavi, Bhanupriya in the pivotal roles and music composed by Laxmikant–Pyarelal.

Plot
Ram (Jeetendra) and Lakshman (Mithun Chakraborty) are two orphan kids who were separated from their parents in childhood. They were brought up by a widowed woman (Chand Usmani) along with her grandson Akbar (Asrani). Ram falls in love with Radha (Madhavi), while Lakshman's sweetheart is Jenny (Bhanupriya). One day, they come across a blind couple (Satyendra Kapoor and Jayshree Gadkar). They recognize them as their long-lost parents who were blinded by a cruel man, Ajit Singh (Amrish Puri). Now Ram and Lakshman decide to seek vengeance, but before they do so, Ajit Singh kills Akbar and kidnaps the entire family. The rest of the story is how Ram and Lakshman protect their family and take revenge against Ajit Singh.

Cast

Jeetendra as Ram 
Mithun Chakraborty as Laxman 
Madhavi as Radha
Bhanupriya as Jenny
Amrish Puri as Ajit Singh
Shakti Kapoor as Manjit Singh
Asrani as Jalaluddin Mohammed Akbar
Vinod Mehra as Police Inspector Thakur
Kader Khan as Pasha
Satyendra Kapoor as Master Shrikant Verma
Jayshree Gadkar as  Mrs. Shrikant Verma
Chand Usmani as Akbar's Grandmother
Yunus Parvez as The Groom
Tiku Talsania as Police Inspector G.B. Parab
Viju Khote as Constable P.K. Kale
Manik Irani as Manglu Dada
Gurbachan Singh as Darshan
Bob Christo as Bob
Mac Mohan as Prakash
Sudhir as Ajit Singh Henchman
Moolchand as Jeweller

Soundtrack
Lyrics: Anand Bakshi

Box office
The film was a success and twelfth highest-grossing movie of 1988.

References

External links
 
 https://archive.today/20130126004154/http://ibosnetwork.com/asp/filmbodetails.asp?id=Mar+Mitenge

1988 films
1980s Hindi-language films
Indian action films
Films scored by Laxmikant–Pyarelal
Films directed by Kawal Sharma
1988 action films